"Ego" is a song by English singer-songwriter Ella Eyre, featuring vocals from American singer, songwriter, and record producer Ty Dolla Sign. It was released as a single on 11 August 2017. The song peaked at number 67 on the UK Singles Chart.

Music video
A music video to accompany the release of "Ego" was first released onto YouTube on 4 September 2017.

Charts

Release history

References

2017 songs
2017 singles
Ella Eyre songs
Songs written by Ella Eyre
Songs written by Fransisca Hall
Songs written by Jesse Shatkin
Songs written by Ty Dolla Sign
Ty Dolla Sign songs
Song recordings produced by Jesse Shatkin